The Cheerful Colsada Girls (Spanish: Las alegres chicas de Colsada) is a 1984 Spanish film directed by Rafael Gil and starring Tania Doris, Luis Cuenca and José Bódalo.

Cast
 as Elena
Luis Cuenca as Manolo
José Bódalo as Don Matías
Antonio Garisa as  Father Eugenio
Máximo Valverde as Juan Luis
Carmen de Lirio as Lola
 as Alfonso
Fernando Sancho as Sr. Barbero
Helga Liné as Charo
Carolina Figueras as ballerina 
 as Trinidad
Ventura Oller
Carolina Figueras Pijuan as ballerina
Silvia Solar

References

External links

Spanish musical comedy films
Films directed by Rafael Gil
1980s Spanish-language films
1980s Spanish films